Piz Cavradi is a mountain of the Swiss Lepontine Alps, located south of Tschamut in the canton of Graubünden.

References

External links
 Piz Cavradi on Hikr

Mountains of the Alps
Mountains of Graubünden
Lepontine Alps
Mountains of Switzerland
Two-thousanders of Switzerland
Tujetsch